Paul Gladney (August 4, 1941 – May 19, 2021), better known by the stage name Paul Mooney, was an American comedian, writer, and actor.

He collaborated with Redd Foxx, Eddie Murphy and Dave Chappelle, wrote for comedian Richard Pryor and the television series Sanford and Son, In Living Color and Chappelle's Show, as well as  acting in The Buddy Holly Story (1978), Spike Lee's satirical film Bamboozled (2000) and Chappelle's Show.

Early life
Mooney was born in 1941 in Shreveport, Louisiana, and moved to Oakland, California, seven years later. His parents were George Gladney and LaVoya Ealy. Mooney was raised primarily by his grandmother Aimay Ealy, known among the family as "Mama". Gladney coined the nickname "Mooney" after the original Scarface (1932) actor Paul Muni (which itself was the actor's stage name).

Career
Mooney became a ringmaster with the Gatti-Charles Circus. During his stint as ringmaster, he always found himself writing comedy and telling jokes, which later helped Mooney land his first professional work as a writer for Richard Pryor.

Mooney wrote some of Pryor's routines for his appearance on Saturday Night Live, co-wrote his material for the Live on the Sunset Strip, Bicentennial, and Is It Something I Said albums, and Pryor's film Jo Jo Dancer, Your Life Is Calling. As the head writer for The Richard Pryor Show, he gave many young comics, such as Robin Williams, Sandra Bernhard, Marsha Warfield, John Witherspoon, and Tim Reid, their first break into show business.

Mooney also wrote for Redd Foxx's Sanford and Son and Good Times, acted in several cult classics including the Richard Pryor comedy films Which Way Is Up?, Bustin' Loose,  and the cult satirical comedy Hollywood Shuffle, and portrayed singer/songwriter Sam Cooke in The Buddy Holly Story.

He was the head writer for the first year of Fox's In Living Color, inspiring the character Homey D. Clown, played by Damon Wayans. Mooney later went on to play Wayans' father in the Spike Lee film Bamboozled as the comedian Junebug.

Mooney initially appeared in the sketches "Ask a Black Dude" and "Mooney at the Movies" on Comedy Central's Chappelle's Show. He later appeared as Negrodamus, an African American version of Nostradamus. As Negrodamus, Mooney ad-libbed the "answers to life's most unsolvable mysteries" such as "Why do white people love Wayne Brady?" (Answer: "Because Wayne Brady makes Bryant Gumbel look like Malcolm X.") Mooney was planning to reprise his role as Negrodamus in the third season of the Chappelle's Show, before Dave Chappelle left the show due to creative and contractual differences.

In 2006, Mooney hosted the BET tribute to Black History Month titled 25 Most @#%! Moments in Black History. In this show, he narrated some of the most shameful incidents involving African Americans since 1980. The top 25 moments included incidents involving Marion Barry, Terrell Owens, Wilson Goode, Michael Jackson, Flavor Flav, Whitney Houston, and Tupac Shakur.

In 2007, Mooney released his first book, the memoir Black Is the New White.

In November 2014, Paul's brother announced that Mooney had prostate cancer. Mooney continued to tour, and perform his stand-up comedy act.

BET Comedy Awards

In September 2005, Mooney performed a segment at the 2005 BET Comedy Awards called the "[[Black People Wake Up Call Award", in which he jokingly presents an award to African American celebrities who neglected their blackness to try and blend in with Caucasians, only to find out they're still a "n-word " in their eyes. The "nominees" included Michael Jackson, Oprah Winfrey, Lil' Kim, and Diana Ross. Mooney awarded Ross and made numerous jokes about Ross's 2002 arrest for DUI. According to people who were in attendance, Mooney also made light of the death of Ross's ex-husband Arne Næss Jr., who fell while mountain climbing in 2004. Tracee Ellis Ross, Ross's daughter and Næss's stepdaughter, was also in attendance. She reportedly was so offended and embarrassed that she left the room. Backstage in the press room, Mooney was asked if he felt his performance was "over the top". Mooney replied: 

When Mooney was informed that Tracee Ellis Ross was in the audience, he stated: 

The majority of Mooney's performance was edited out of the televised broadcast and not aired.

The N-Word

On November 26, 2006, Mooney appeared on CNN and talked about how he would stop using the word " due to Michael Richards's outbursts on stage at the Laugh Factory. He referred to Richards as having become "his Dr. Phil" and "cured" him of the use of the epithet. Mooney also said, "We're gonna stop using the n-word. I'm gonna stop using it. I'm not gonna use it again and I'm not gonna use the b-word. And we're gonna put an end to the n-word. Just say no to the n-word. We want all human beings throughout the world to stop using the n-word."

On November 30, Mooney elaborated upon these remarks from his appearance on CNN as a guest of Farai Chideya on the National Public Radio program News & Notes. He declared that he would convene a conference on this controversial subject in the near future, as well as perform his first "n-free" comedy in the upcoming days.

That show, which he performed at the Lincoln Theater following a set by Dick Gregory, took place on December 2, 2006. Mooney almost made it through his entire set—about an hour of jokes—before he mistakenly used the word in a routine on O. J. Simpson. He ran off stage covering his face in his hands, and walked back on a few moments later saying, "I'm really going to get it now. This is probably already on the Internet." On the BET special 25 Events that Mis-Shaped Black America, Mooney reiterated that he was no longer using the word. He was quoted as saying, "I am no longer going to use the n-word. Instead of saying 'What's up my nigga,' say 'What's up my Michael Richards.'"  At a summit with Jesse Jackson, Reverend Al Sharpton and Richards, Mooney forgave Richards.

Personal life
In an August 2019 interview with Comedy Hype, Richard Pryor's ex-bodyguard, Rashon Khan, alleged that Mooney had molested Pryor's son, Richard Pryor Jr., when Pryor Jr. was a child. Khan also alleged that Pryor had expressed a desire to have Mooney killed in a murder-for-hire plot over this incident and was only prevented from doing so by his 1980 fire incident. Richard Pryor Jr. has confirmed he was raped, but did not mention Mooney by name as his alleged rapist.

Death
On May 19, 2021, Mooney died of a heart attack at his home in Oakland, California, at the age of 79.

Filmography

Film

Television

Stand-up
 Race (StepSun Music/Tommy Boy, 1993) CD
 Master Piece (StepSun Music, 1994) CD
 Analyzing White America (SHOUT! Factory/Sony Music Video, 2004) DVD
 Know Your History: Jesus Is Black; So Was Cleopatra (QD3 Entertainment, 2006) DVD
 It's the End of the World (2010) DVD
 Shaquille O' Neal's All Star Comedy Jam (2010) TV
 The Godfather of Comedy (2012) TV

Bibliography
In his book Black Is the New White, Mooney talks about his partnership with Richard Pryor, from their first meeting to Pryor's death in 2005. Mooney reflects on his childhood and some of the most notorious moments in his life, including organizing a performers' strike on the Comedy Store and publicly giving up the n-word after Michael Richards' onstage outburst. It features a foreword written by Dave Chappelle.

References

External links

 
 

1941 births
2021 deaths
20th-century American comedians
21st-century American comedians
20th-century African-American people
21st-century African-American people
African-American male actors
African-American male comedians
American male comedians
American male film actors
American male screenwriters
American social commentators
American stand-up comedians
American male television actors
African-American television producers
Television producers from California
American television writers
Writers from Shreveport, Louisiana
Writers from Oakland, California
Berkeley High School (Berkeley, California) alumni
Male actors from Oakland, California
Actors from Shreveport, Louisiana
American male television writers
People from the San Francisco Bay Area
American male non-fiction writers
Screenwriters from California
Screenwriters from Louisiana
Film producers from California
Film producers from Louisiana
Comedians from California
Comedians from Louisiana